Vasuki Vaibhav is an Indian composer and singer, music director, Actor known for his work in Kannada-language films. Vaibhav gained recognition after appearing in Rama Rama Re (2016). He was the second runner-up of Big Boss Kannada Season 7.

Career
Vasuki started as a theatre artist and started to sing, compose, write lyrics, act and has even produced plays. His breakthrough in Kannada cinema was in the 2016 film Rama Rama Re. His work in Sarkari Hi. Pra. Shaale Kasaragodu Koduge: Ramanna Rai was praised by both audience and critics.

Discography

As composer

As actor

Web series

Television

Awards

References

Living people
Indian male actors
Indian male composers
Indian male singer-songwriters
Indian singer-songwriters
1993 births
21st-century Indian actors